A vertical and/or short take-off and landing (V/STOL) aircraft is an airplane able to take-off or land vertically or on short runways. Vertical takeoff and landing (VTOL) aircraft are a subset of V/STOL craft that do not require runways at all. Generally, a V/STOL aircraft needs to be able to hover. Helicopters are not considered under the V/STOL classification as the classification is only used for aeroplanes, aircraft that achieve lift (force) in forward flight by planing the air, thereby achieving speed and fuel efficiency that is typically greater than the capability of helicopters.

Most V/STOL aircraft types were experiments or outright failures from the 1950s to 1970s.  V/STOL aircraft types that have been produced in large numbers include the F-35B Lightning II, Harrier, Yak-38 Forger and V-22 Osprey.

A rolling takeoff, sometimes with a ramp (ski-jump), reduces the amount of thrust required to lift an aircraft from the ground (compared with vertical takeoff), and hence increases the payload and range that can be achieved for a given thrust. For instance, the Harrier is incapable of taking off vertically with full weapons and fuel load.  Hence V/STOL aircraft generally use a runway if it is available.  I.e. short takeoff and vertical landing (STOVL) or conventional takeoff and landing (CTOL) operation is preferred to VTOL operation.

V/STOL was developed to allow fast jets to be operated from clearings in forests, from very short runways, and from small aircraft carriers that would previously only have been able to carry helicopters.

The main advantage of V/STOL aircraft is closer basing to the enemy, which reduces response time and tanker support requirements. In the case of the Falklands War, it also permitted high-performance fighter air cover and ground attack without a large aircraft carrier equipped with aircraft catapult.

Lists of V/STOL aircraft

This is a partial list; there have been many designs for V/STOL aircraft.

Vectored thrust
 Hawker P.1127/Kestrel/Harrier; four rotating nozzles for vectored thrust of fan and jet exhaust.

Tilt-jet
 Bell XF-109
 Bell 65
 EWR VJ 101

Tilt-rotor
 AgustaWestland AW609 (originally Bell 609)
 AgustaWestland Project Zero technology demonstrator
 Bell XV-3
 Bell XV-15
 Bell-Boeing V-22 Osprey (scale up of XV-15)
 Bell V-280 Valor

Tilt-wing
 Curtiss-Wright X-19 – four rotating propellers, tilt-wing.
 Canadair CL-84 Dynavert, two turboprop tilt-wing 
 LTV XC-142 four-engine tilt-wing cross-shafted turboprop
 Bell X-22 rotating ducted propellers. Small transport prototype. Slightly smaller than V-22 Osprey.
 Hiller X-18

Separate thrust and lift
 Dornier Do 31 Jet transport with podded vector nozzles and lift engines
 Kamov Ka-22
 Lockheed XV-4 Hummingbird
 Dassault Balzac V (V stands for vertical and is a modified Mirage III)
 Dassault Mirage IIIV the first VTOL capable of supersonic flight (Mach 2.03 during tests)
 Fokker/Republic D-24 Alliance
 Ryan XV-5. Fans in wings driven by engine exhaust gas.
 VFW VAK 191B Attack fighter similar to Harrier but supersonic dash speed, smaller wings and lift engines. Flown, but not operational.
 Yakovlev Yak-38
 Yakovlev Yak-141
 Short SC.1

Supersonic
Although many aircraft have been proposed and built, with a few being tested, the F-35B is the first and only supersonic V/STOL aircraft to have reached operational service, having entered service in 2016.
 Bell D-188A Mach 2 swivelling engines, mockup stage
 EWR VJ 101 Mach 2 fighter, flown to Mach 1.04 but not operational
 Dassault Mirage IIIV Delta wing Mach 2 fighter with lift engines, first VTOL capable of supersonic and Mach 2 flight (Mach 2.03 during tests), not operational
 Hawker Siddeley P.1154 M1.7 Supersonic Harrier. It was not completed
 Republic AP-100 strike fighter concept
 Rockwell XFV-12 Built with complex "window blind" wings but could not lift its own weight
 Yakovlev Yak-141 Lift engines plus swivel tailpipe
 Lockheed Martin X-35B / F-35B uses a vectored-thrust tailpipe (the Pratt & Whitney F135) plus a shaft-driven lifting fan. It is the first aircraft capable of demonstrating transition from short take-off to supersonic flight to vertical landing on the same sortie.

References

External links
 V/STOL Wheel of Misfortune

Types of take-off and landing